Robert Tracy (1706? – 28 September 1767) of Stanway House, nr. Tewkesbury, Gloucestershire was an English Member of Parliament.

He was born the eldest son of John Tracy of Stanway and educated at New College, Oxford (1724). He succeeded his father in 1735.

He entered Parliament in 1734 as the member for Tewkesbury, sitting until 1741. He was afterwards elected in 1748 to represent Worcester until 1754.

In 1734 he became a trustee and common councilman for the newly formed colony of Georgia on the east coast of America. He was active in persuading Robert Walpole to release more funds for the colony.

He died in 1767. He had married in 1735 Anna Maria, the daughter of Sir Roger Hudson, a director of South Sea Company. They had no children. The Stanway estate passed to his niece Henrietta Keck, daughter of his brother Anthony Tracy (who had changed his surname to Keck). Henrietta changed her surname to Tracy and later married to Edward Devereux, 12th Viscount Hereford.

See also
 Trustees for the Establishment of the Colony of Georgia in America

References

|-

1700s births
1767 deaths
People from Tewkesbury
Alumni of New College, Oxford
Members of the Parliament of Great Britain for English constituencies
British MPs 1734–1741
British MPs 1747–1754
Year of birth uncertain